Modesto Brito González (born 4 December 1954) is a Mexican politician affiliated with the Party of the Democratic Revolution. He served as Deputy of the LX Legislature of the Mexican Congress representing Guerrero, and previously served two non-consecutive terms as municipal president of Teloloapan between 1996 and 2005.

References

1954 births
Living people
Politicians from Guerrero
Municipal presidents in Guerrero
Party of the Democratic Revolution politicians
20th-century Mexican politicians
21st-century Mexican politicians
Deputies of the LX Legislature of Mexico
Members of the Chamber of Deputies (Mexico) for Guerrero